was the second vessel in the two-ship  of armoured cruisers in the Imperial Japanese Navy. She was named after Mount Ikoma located on the border of Osaka and Nara prefecture. On 28 August 1912, Ikoma was re-classified as a battlecruiser.

Background
These were the first major capital ships to be designed and constructed entirely by Japan in a Japanese shipyard, albeit with imported weaponry and numerous components. However, Tsukuba and Ikoma were designed and completed in a very short time, and suffered from numerous technical and design problems, including strength of its hull, stability and mechanical failures. The ship was reclassified as a battlecruiser in 1912.

Design
Ikoma was one of the first ships in the Japanese navy with boilers capable of burning either coal or heavy fuel oil.
In terms of armament, the Tsukuba class was one of the most heavily armed cruisers of its time, with four 12-inch 41st Year Type guns as the main battery, mounted in twin gun turrets to the fore and aft, along the centerline of the vessel. Secondary armament consisted of twelve  guns and twelve 4.7-inch 41st Year Type guns, and four QF 3-pounder Hotchkiss guns.

Service record
Ikoma was laid down on 15 March 1905, launched 9 April 1906 and commissioned on 24 March 1908 at Kure Naval Arsenal, with Captain Egarashi Yasutaro as her chief equipping officer and first captain.

Shortly after commissioning at the Kure Naval Arsenal, Ikoma escorted the United States Navy’s Great White Fleet through Japanese waters on its around-the-world voyage in October 1908.

In 1910, Ikoma was sent on a voyage to Argentina to attend that nation’s independence centennial celebrations. From Buenos Aires, she continued on across the Atlantic Ocean to London, England and to other ports in Europe and returned to Japan via the Indian Ocean, thus circumnavigating the globe.

Ikoma served in World War I, initially during the blockade of the German port of Tsingtao in China during the Battle of Tsingtao from September 1914 as part of Japan's contribution to the Allied war effort under the Anglo-Japanese Alliance. After the fall of the city, Tsukuba was sent out as part of the search for the German East Asiatic Squadron in the South Pacific until the destruction of the German squadron in the Battle of the Falklands in December 1914. From 1 November 1914 to 17 January 1915, Ikoma was based out of Hong Kong, Singapore and Townsville, Australia, protecting British colonies and shipping from German commerce raiders.

On 4 December 1915, Ikoma was in a fleet review off of Yokohama, attended by Emperor Taishō in which 124 ships participated.  A similar fleet review was held again off Yokohama on 25 October 1916. Ikoma remained in Japanese home waters in 1916 and 1917.

Ikoma was a victim of the Washington Naval Agreement of 1922 and was scrapped at Mitsubishi Heavy Industries Nagasaki shipyards in compliance with that accord. She was removed from the navy list on 20 September 1923.

Notes

References

Tsukuba-class cruisers
Ships built by Kure Naval Arsenal
1906 ships
World War I cruisers of Japan
Battlecruisers of the Imperial Japanese Navy